Emily Brydon (born April 21, 1980, in Fernie, British Columbia) is a Canadian former alpine skier. She reached the podium on the World Cup circuit nine times—five in downhill, three in super G, and one in combined—and won once, a super G in 2008 in St. Moritz. She competed in the 2006 Winter Olympics. Her coaches were Heinzpeter Platter, Rob Boyd, and Brett Zagozewski. She also competed in the 2010 Winter Olympics but fell and did not finish.

References

External links 
 
 
 
 Profile at Vancouver 2010 Winter Olympics
 

1980 births
Living people
Alpine skiers at the 2002 Winter Olympics
Alpine skiers at the 2006 Winter Olympics
Alpine skiers at the 2010 Winter Olympics
Canadian female alpine skiers
Olympic alpine skiers of Canada
People from Fernie, British Columbia
Sportspeople from British Columbia
20th-century Canadian women
21st-century Canadian women